Peter Green (15 February 1920 – 24 April 2011) was a Canadian rower. He competed in the men's eight event at the 1948 Summer Olympics.

References

1920 births
2011 deaths
Canadian male rowers
Olympic rowers of Canada
Rowers at the 1948 Summer Olympics
Sportspeople from British Columbia